Wingrove is an electoral ward of Newcastle upon Tyne in North East England, roughly 2 miles west of Newcastle City Centre. The population of the ward as of mid-2018 was 12,773.

References

External links
 Newcastle Council Ward Info: Wingrove

Districts of Newcastle upon Tyne
Wards of Newcastle upon Tyne